The A22 motorway is a motorway in the Netherlands. It is one of the shorter motorways in the Netherlands, with a total length of approximately 8 kilometers.

The A22 starts at the interchange Velsen, where it splits from the A9 motorway. After interchange IJmuiden, exit IJmuiden, the Velsertunnel, and exit Beverwijk, it rejoins with the A9 motorway at the interchange Beverwijk.

Wijkertunnel 

Until 1996, the entire A22 motorway was part of the A9, but due to the rising capacity problems in and around the Velsertunnel, it was decided to build an additional tunnel about a kilometer east of the Velsertunnel: the Wijkertunnel. When this tunnel was finished, the new road section and tunnel became part of the A9, while the old road and tunnel were renumbered to A22. Both the new and the old tunnel have two lanes in each direction.

Exit list

References

External links

Motorways in the Netherlands
Motorways in North Holland
Beverwijk
Velsen